Chuck's Day Off is a cooking show starring restaurateur and chef Chuck Hughes.  It was spun off with Chuck's Week Off in which Hughes spent his vacation in Mexico helping out people in the food industry and or trying out the different regional cuisines.

References

External links
Chuck's Day Off at CookingChannel.com

Food Network (Canadian TV channel) original programming